Desborough College is a secondary school with academy status located on Shoppenhangers Road, Maidenhead, Berkshire, England.

Until 2009 it was an all-boys school, however, the sixth form has since become co-educational. It was founded as Maidenhead Modern School in 1894 under its first Headmaster, F. Fairman, who was headmaster until 1910.

In the 1970s reform in the Royal Borough ensured all schools converted to the then new comprehensive schools system, which prompted the school's name change to Desborough School after Lord Desborough, a prominent Maidonian.

For the second time in the school's history it changed status in 2012 becoming an Academy school, and changed its name to Desborough College. As part of its academy status it initially partnered with the independent Radley College, Microsoft and The John Lewis Partnership.

History 
According to the book One Hundred Not Out written by a former History master at the School, David M. Evans, the school was founded as Maidenhead Modern School in 1894, and was originally located on High Town Road.  It was originally a private venture until taken over by Berkshire County Council in 1906, from whence the teachers became employees of the county. The school eventually moved to its present site on Shoppenhangers Road in 1910, after land had been purchased from Lord Desborough, after whom the school was eventually named. At this point the school was named Maidenhead County Boys’ School.
In 1943, and under the Headmastership of A. W. Eagling, the school became known as Maidenhead County Boys' Grammar School, a status that it maintained until September 1973 when it converted to comprehensive schooling.

During the 1990s Desborough School became a grant-maintained school. The passing of the School Standards and Framework Act 1998 abolished grant-maintained schools and Desborough reverted to LEA control. 

A renovation of the historic main school building was completed in 2006. This saw a new library and staff room, more classrooms and the removal of the school reception to the old music house. A new music department has been built in the place of the old temporary buildings. 

The school became an academy in October 2012 and changed its official name to Desborough College.

School houses
There are four school houses in Desborough which relate to important figures in British history, each with its own colour:
 Hart
 Lion
 Phoenix
 Eagle

On their arrival at Desborough, every new boy is placed into a house where they can compete in various areas such as sporting events or other extra curricular activities. At the end of every major term an end of term assembly is held where the houses' points are collated from competing in various areas such as chess, rugby, hockey, and so on and then the house with the highest number of points is awarded with a trophy for the period of the next term. The colour of each house is displayed on the students tie with a series of stripes and on their house polo shirts as the primary colour.

Notable former pupils

Notable former pupils include:
Toby Anstis, radio DJ for London's Heart FM. Toby Anstis visited the school to take part in the BBC school report.
John B, drum and bass DJ and graduate of molecular biology
Guy Fletcher, Dire Straits keyboard player
 Donald Hamilton Fraser, famed for his abstract landscape paintings.
Derek Hallworth, Countdown director 
Charles Hart, lyricist (Aspects of Love, The Phantom of the Opera, Love Never Dies)
Matt Holmes, Commandant General Royal Marines
Nick Hornby, best-selling author whose novels have been adapted into film (About a Boy, High Fidelity)
Peter Jones, multi-millionaire entrepreneur who returned to the school in September 2008
John O'Farrell, author
Mark Richardson, GB 400-metre runner
Neil Woodford, British fund manager
Richard Fitzpatrick, U.S. Marine, Founder Magpul Industries Corp

Headteachers
Desborough has had many headteachers:
 Mr. F. Fairman, 1894 – 1910
 Mr. J. Stanton, 1910 – 1913
 Mr. A. E. Brooks, 1913 – 1941
 Mr. A. W. Eagling, 1941 – 1954 (Oversaw conversion to Grammar School)
 Mr. J. C. Oliver, 1954 – 1960
 Mr. C. Macdonald, 1960 – 1965
 Mr. L. C. Reynolds DSC,OBE, 1965 – 1981 (oversaw conversion to Comprehensive School)
 Mr.  D. F. Miller, 1981 – 1988
 Mr. M. J. Oddie, 1988 - 1994
 Mr. D. Eyre, 1994 - 2005, who moved to Brighton Hill Community College at Basingstoke.
 Mr. Linnell, 2005 - 2012 
 Mr. D. Frazer, 2012 - 2019 
 Ms. M. Callaghan, 2019– 2022, the first ever female headteacher of Desborough.
 Mr. A. Murdoch, 2022 - present

Sixth Form 
Desborough sixth form offers full-time places to female students, thus making it a mixed sixth form. It is led by the head of Key Stage 5 education and two heads of year. The sixth form facilities include a private study section of the Library, with a selection of specialist books, three private computer suites and a quiet study room.

The school has joined The Consortium programme along with Altwood Church of England School, Cox Green, Newlands School and Furze Platt Senior School in 2003. The Consortium allows sixth form students to take a subject not offered at their school and study it at another participating school. Subjects such as geology and politics are among the subjects that Desborough offers to the other schools. Transport is provided between schools.

References

External links 
 Desborough College website

Boys' schools in Berkshire
Academies in the Royal Borough of Windsor and Maidenhead
Secondary schools in the Royal Borough of Windsor and Maidenhead
Educational institutions established in 1894
1894 establishments in England
Maidenhead